
Gmina Wilczyn is a rural gmina (administrative district) in Konin County, Greater Poland Voivodeship, in west-central Poland.

Villages
Gmina Wilczyn contains the villages and settlements of Biela, Cegielnia, Dębówiec, Dębówiec-Towarzystwo, Głęboczek, Gogolina, Góry, Kaliska, Kopydłówek, Kopydłowo, Kościeszki, Kownaty, Kownaty-Kolonia, Maślaki, Mrówki, Nowa Gogolina, Nowy Świat, Ościsłowo, Ostrówek, Suchary, Świętne, Wacławowo, Wilczogóra, Wilczyn, Wiśniewa, Wturek, Wygorzele and Zygmuntowo.

Neighbouring gminas
Gmina Wilczyn is bordered by the gminas of Jeziora Wielkie, Kleczew, Orchowo, Skulsk, Ślesin and Strzelno.

References
Polish official population figures 2006

Wilczyn
Konin County